St. Vincent's may refer to:

Schools
 St. Vincent's Academy, in Savannah, Georgia
 St. Vincent's C.B.S., a secondary school in Dublin, Ireland 
 St Vincent's College, Potts Point, Australia, a Roman Catholic, secondary, boarding and day school for girls
 St. Vincent's Convent School, an English Medium School in India 
 St. Vincent's High and Technical School, one of the oldest schools in eastern India
 St. Vincent's High School, an English Medium School in Pune, India
 Ascham St Vincent's School, an English preparatory school for boys in England
 St. Vincent's College, Los Angeles, California, that became Loyola Marymount University

Other
 St. Vincent's Day Care, a non-profit agency
 St Vincents GAA, a Gaelic Athletic Association club based in Ireland
 St Vincent's Quarter, Sheffield, South Yorkshire, Yorkshire and the Humber, England, United Kingdom
 St. Vincent's-St. Stephen's-Peter's River, Canada
 Saint Vincent's Infant Asylum, a former orphanage in Milwaukee, Wisconsin
 Vincents Lake, a lake close to the northern coast of Nova Scotia

See also
 Saint Vincent (disambiguation)
 St. Vincent's Hospital (disambiguation)